Guvernadurica, or Gubernadurica, is the dungeon in the monastery of Cetinje, Montenegro, which is named after the first political prisoner, the last gubernadur of Montenegro, Vukolaj Radonjic.

History
Guvernadurica, the oldest prison in Cetinje, did not have doors, and the cave had a permanent temperature of 0° Celsius throughout the year. On the south side of the church there is a two-floor administrative building, with a dungeon in the ground floor, named Guvernadurica, after its most famous prisoner, Governor Vukolaj Radonjić, who was originally sentenced to death along with his brother Marko Radonjic, later changed to imprisonment. The Guvernadurica was used as a prison for political prisoners until the end of World War II.

References

Cetinje
Prisons in Montenegro